The 2022 Manitoba Scotties Tournament of Hearts presented by Bayer, the provincial women's curling championship for Manitoba, was held from December 15 to 19, 2021 at the Carberry Plains Community Centre in Carberry, Manitoba. The winning Mackenzie Zacharias team represented Manitoba at the 2022 Scotties Tournament of Hearts in Thunder Bay, Ontario.

The event included the World #1 ranked Tracy Fleury rink, who failed to make it to the playoffs in a shocking result.

Qualification process

Teams
The teams are listed as follows:

Round-robin standings
Final round-robin standings

Round-robin results
All draws are listed in Central Time (UTC−06:00).

Draw 1
Wednesday, December 15, 8:30 am

Draw 2
Wednesday, December 15, 12:15 pm

Draw 3
Wednesday, December 15, 4:00 pm

Draw 4
Wednesday, December 15, 8:00 pm

Draw 5
Thursday, December 16, 8:30 am

Draw 6
Thursday, December 16, 12:15 pm

Draw 7
Thursday, December 16, 4:00 pm

Draw 8
Thursday, December 16, 7:45 pm

Draw 9
Friday, December 17, 9:00 am

Draw 10
Friday, December 17, 1:00 pm

Championship Round

Standings
Final Championship Pool Standings

Results

Draw 11
Friday, December 17, 6:30 pm

Draw 12
Saturday, December 18, 10:00 am

Draw 13
Saturday, December 18, 4:00 pm

Playoffs

Semifinal
Sunday, December 19, 10:00 am

Final
Sunday, December 19, 4:00 pm

Notes

References

2021 in Manitoba
Curling in Manitoba
2022 Scotties Tournament of Hearts
December 2021 sports events in Canada